Zaara Vineet (born 2007) is an Indian actress and television personality, who has appeared in Tamil language films and television. Often working on shows by network Zee Tamil, Zaara made her debut in 2018 in the television show Super Mom as a host at the age of 11. She also appeared in the film Doctor in 2021 as a child artist. She is also one of the youngest child artists in history to host a television show at only the age of 11.

Career 
Zaara started her career in 2018 in Zee Tamil in the comedy reality show Super Mom as a host alongside her mother Archana Chandhoke who is also a television host. Since 2018 until present Zaara and her mother have been hosting the show continuous. In 2021, actor Sivakarthikeyan approached Zaara privately and gave her a special opportunity to mark her film debut in his film Doctor playing a crucial supporting character. She also won the Best Child Artist for the film at the JFW Awards 2022.

In 2020, when her mother Archana entered the reality show Bigg Boss Tamil 4 she and her family received threats and hatred after viewing seeing and reacting in a negative manner after viewing Archana's behavior in the show. She later tarnished all the negative comments and stated "My mum is the best mum in the whole world. And i will not tolerate any negative views against her". However viewers and fans started stating Zaara as a "Matured young lady".

Personal life
Zaara was born to Vineet Muthukrishnan and Archana Chandhoke in 2007 in Chennai, Tamil Nadu. She loved and has passion in cinema and hosting since she was 7 years old. She is also a part time photographer.

Filmography

Film

Awards

References

External links 

 
 

Living people
2007 births
Indian Tamil people
21st-century Indian actresses
Actresses in Tamil cinema
People from Chennai
Television personalities from Tamil Nadu